is a Japanese manga series written and illustrated by Nana Haruta. Tsubasa to Hotaru was serialized in the monthly  manga magazine Ribon from the September 2013 issue to the December 2017 issue. During the series' run, an anime adaptation was screened at Ribon Festa 2014 and episodes were later produced as animated segments in the children's variety show Oha Suta.

Plot

Tsubasa Sonokawa is a high school student who falls in love with an upperclassmen after he helped her when she fainted from anemia at the train station. After getting rejected, Tsubasa decides to help Yuri with managing the boys' basketball team and becomes acquainted with Aki Hidaka, Yūma Toba, and Yoshinari Karasuma. As Tsubasa gets closer to Aki, she discovers that he was the one who saved her when she fainted, and she begins to fall in love with him.

Characters

Tsubasa is a bubbly high school student who wants to be seen as dependable by her peers. She becomes one of the managers of the basketball team.

Aki is a member of the basketball team, and his classmates call him . He is quiet, but he has a strong appetite.

Yūma is a member of the basketball team and one of the most popular boys in school, especially among the girls, who regard him as a gentleman. After noticing Tsubasa's hardworking nature, he eventually falls in love with her.

Yoshinari is a member of the basketball team and Tsubasa's classmate. He is energetic, but he is also oblivious during serious situations.

Yuri is Tsubasa's childhood friend who is a year her senior. She is the manager of the basketball team.

Hachiya is a third-year student on the basketball team and Yuri's boyfriend.

Ran is one of the most popular girls in Tsubasa's school and one of the winners of the school's pageant during the cultural festival. She is interested in Yūma.

Sugiyama is an upperclassmen who Tsubasa falls in love with at first, believing him to be the one who saved her when she fainted. He rejects her for being overbearing.

Media

Manga

Tsubasa to Hotaru is written and illustrated by Nana Haruta. It was serialized in the monthly magazine Ribon from the September 2013 issue released on August 3, 2013, to the December 2017 issue released on November 2, 2017. The chapters were later released in 11 bound volumes by Shueisha under the Ribon Mascot Comics imprint.

A side story of Haruta's previous work, Stardust Wink, was serialized in the 2013 Winter Daizōkan edition of Ribon Special and was later published in volume 1 of Tsubasa to Hotaru. An official fan book featuring Haruta's color artwork and character profiles, titled Towa High School Boys Basketball Team Fan Book, was released on August 3, 2016 with the September 2016 issue of Ribon.

Anime

An anime adaptation was first announced in the February 2014 issue of Ribon. The anime was written and directed by Chiaki Kon, with animation produced by J.C.Staff. The anime was screened at Ribon Festa 2014, which took place on March 16 in Miyagi Prefecture, March 21 in Hiroshima, March 29–30 in Kyoto, and April 5–6 in Yokohama. The ending theme song is "Tsubasa to Hotaru" and is performed by Kanae Itō, the voice actress of Tsubasa.

Several episodes were then created and aired as short animated segments on the children's variety show Oha Suta, which was broadcast on TV Tokyo. The first part aired in four weekly segments from March 6, 2015 to March 27, 2015. The second part aired in three weekly segments from May 10, 2016 to May 24, 2016.

Reception

Volume 2 debuted on Oricon at #27, with 31,895 copies sold in its first week. Volume 3 debuted on Oricon at #37, with 26,214 copies sold in its first week and 51,393 copies overall. Volume 4 debuted on Oricon at #22, with 32,446 copies sold in its first week and 61,195 copies overall. Volume 5 debuted on Oricon at #9, with 66,822 copies sold in its first week and 88,881 copies overall.

References

External links
 
 
 

Anime series based on manga
Romance anime and manga
J.C.Staff
School life in anime and manga
Shōjo manga
Shueisha manga